Perez, also written as Pharez/Perets, was the son of Tamar and Judah, and the twin of Zerah, according to the Book of Genesis. The twins were conceived after Tamar tricked her father-in-law Judah into having sexual intercourse with her by disguising herself as a prostitute. The name is transliterated to English as both "Perez" (NIV, ESV, NKJV) and "Pharez" (KJV). According to Ethiopian tradition, Perez became a king of Persia.

Family tree

Biblical account

27 And it came to pass in the time of her travail, that, behold, twins [were] in her womb.
28 And it came to pass, when she travailed, that [the one] put out [his] hand: and the midwife took and bound upon his hand a scarlet thread, saying, This came out first.
29 And it came to pass, as he drew back his hand, that, behold, his brother came out: and she said, How hast thou broken forth? [this] breach [be] upon thee: therefore his name was called Pharez.
30 And afterward came out his brother, that had the scarlet thread upon his hand: and his name was called Zarah.

The Book of Ruth lists Perez as being part of the ancestral genealogy of King David, and both the Gospel of Matthew and the Gospel of Luke include him when specifying the genealogy of Jesus.

References

Book of Genesis people
Biblical twins
Tribe of Judah
Book of Ruth
Gospel of Matthew
Gospel of Luke